Petr Hrdlička (born 23 December 1967) is a Czech sport shooter and Olympic champion for Czechoslovakia. He won a gold medal in trap shooting at the 1992 Summer Olympics in Barcelona. Hrdlička was born in Brno.

References

External links
 

1967 births
Living people
Czechoslovak male sport shooters
Czech male sport shooters
Trap and double trap shooters
Olympic shooters of Czechoslovakia
Olympic gold medalists for Czechoslovakia
Shooters at the 1992 Summer Olympics
Sportspeople from Brno
Olympic medalists in shooting

Medalists at the 1992 Summer Olympics